In Good Company was a Canadian entertainment and current affairs television series which aired on CBC Television from 1975 to 1976.

Premise
Hana Gartner (Take 30, The Fifth Estate) hosted this Toronto-produced series. Segments featured presenters such as Rod Coneybeare, Ruthie Lunenfeld and Ben Wicks, with satirical segments featuring the Royal Canadian Air Farce's Roger Abbott and Don Ferguson. The series also included hidden camera features produced by John Kastner.

Scheduling
The first season of this half-hour series was broadcast on Mondays, Wednesdays and Fridays at 7:00 p.m. (Eastern) from 22 September 1975 to 9 January 1976. The second season aired on Mondays only in an hour-long format from 12 January to 31 May 1976.

References

External links
 
 

CBC Television original programming
1975 Canadian television series debuts
1976 Canadian television series endings